The Battle of Olšava was an engagement of Bohemian and Hungarian troops near the Olšava River along the frontier of the two realms in May 1116. The event started as a peaceful meeting between the young Stephen II of Hungary and Vladislaus I of Bohemia, according to Hungarian chronicles. The Czech Cosmas of Prague wrote that the Hungarians came to the border to provocate a war.

References

Sources

Primary sources 

Cosmas of Prague: The Chronicle of the Czechs (Translated with an introduction and notes by Lisa Wolverton) (2009). The Catholic University of America Press. .

Secondary sources 

 
 
 
 
 
 

Battles involving Hungary
Battles involving Bohemia
Conflicts in 1116